David William Eiland (born July 5, 1966) is an American former professional baseball player who was a pitcher for ten Major League Baseball seasons.  Eiland played college baseball for the University of Florida and the University of South Florida, and thereafter, played professionally for the New York Yankees, San Diego Padres and Tampa Bay Devil Rays.  He has also been a pitching coach for the New York Yankees, the New York Mets and the Kansas City Royals.

Early years
Eiland was born in Dade City, Florida.  He graduated from Zephyrhills High School.

College career
Eiland accepted an athletic scholarship to attend the University of Florida in Gainesville, Florida, where he played for the Florida Gators football team.  He later transferred to the University of South Florida in Tampa, Florida, and finished his collegiate career playing for the South Florida Bulls baseball team. In 1986, he played collegiate summer baseball with the Falmouth Commodores of the Cape Cod Baseball League.

Professional career
The New York Yankees selected Eiland in the seventh round of the 1987 MLB draft and he made his major league pitching debut with the Yankees in August 1988. Used mainly in spot chances, Eiland pitched in New York for four seasons, winning five games. He was traded to the Padres in 1992 and did not win a game in two seasons despite starting in nine games. Eiland was sent back to the Yankees in 1995 and played for the expansion Devil Rays for three seasons before retiring in 2000. He played for 10 seasons, with 12 wins and 27 losses and a career ERA of 5.74.

During his time with the Devil Rays, Eiland acted as a body double for Kevin Costner, who played a starting pitcher and run scorer in the 1999 film For Love of the Game.

Eiland was named International League Most Valuable Pitcher in 1990 while playing for the Columbus Clippers with a 16–5 record and a 2.87 ERA. He was a 2012 inductee in the International League Hall of Fame.

Eiland is the only player in Major League Baseball history to give up a home run to the first batter he ever faced (Paul Molitor) and hit a home run in his very first plate appearance. The pitcher was Bob Ojeda. It was the only home run Eiland hit in 27 plate appearances.

Coaching career

New York Yankees
After retiring in 2000, Eiland joined the Yankees organization and worked as a pitching coach in the minor leagues.  He coached the Gulf Coast Yankees in 2003, the Staten Island Yankees in 2004, the Trenton Thunder in 2005 and 2006, and the Scranton/Wilkes-Barre Yankees in 2007. During his tenure in the Yankees farm system, Eiland oversaw the development of prospects including Phil Hughes, Joba Chamberlain, and Ian Kennedy.

Eiland replaced Ron Guidry as the Yankees pitching coach in 2008.  It was speculated that his relationships with many of the young pitchers contributed to him being chosen as the new pitching coach for the Yankees. He took a personal leave of absence from the Yankees beginning on June 4, 2010, and returned to the team on June 29. "Besides being in my home, this is the most comfortable place in the world for me," he said upon returning. "This is what I do; this is what I have a passion for." Eiland was fired on October 25, 2010. Eiland then hired agent Burton Rocks.

Tampa Bay Rays
After the 2010 season, Eiland joined the Tampa Bay Rays in an advisory role.

Kansas City Royals
On October 25, 2011, Eiland was named as the pitching coach for the Kansas City Royals. He was let go by the Royals after the 2017 season.

New York Mets
After the Mets named Mickey Callaway as their manager following the 2017 season, Eiland was hired as the Mets' pitching coach. Eiland was fired on June 20, 2019.

Lexington Legends
On March 2, 2021, Eiland was named pitching coach for the Lexington Legends of the Atlantic League of Professional Baseball. Eiland did not return for the 2022 season.

See also

 Florida Gators
 List of Florida Gators baseball players

References

External links

1966 births
Living people
Albany-Colonie Yankees players
Baseball players from Florida
Charlotte Knights players
Columbus Clippers players
Durham Bulls players
Falmouth Commodores players
Florida Gators baseball players
Fort Lauderdale Yankees players
Gulf Coast Yankees players
Kansas City Royals coaches
Las Vegas Stars (baseball) players
Louisville Redbirds players
Major League Baseball pitchers
Major League Baseball pitching coaches
New York Mets coaches
New York Yankees coaches
New York Yankees players
Oklahoma City 89ers players
Oneonta Yankees players
Orlando Rays players
People from Dade City, Florida
San Diego Padres players
South Florida Bulls baseball players
Tampa Bay Devil Rays players
Tampa Yankees players